Ralph Boley Mellix (April 29, 1896 – March 23, 1985), sometimes listed as "Felix", and nicknamed "Lefty", was an American Negro league pitcher in the 1930s and 1940s.

A native of Atlantic City, New Jersey, Mellix attended Peabody High School in Pittsburgh, Pennsylvania. In 1934, he played for the Newark Dodgers, and in 1935 and 1943 he appeared for the Homestead Grays. Mellix died in Homewood, Pennsylvania in 1985 at age 88.

References

External links
  and Seamheads
 Lefty Mellix biography from Society for American Baseball Research (SABR)

1896 births
1985 deaths
Homestead Grays players
Newark Dodgers players
Baseball pitchers
Baseball players from New Jersey
Sportspeople from Atlantic City, New Jersey
20th-century African-American sportspeople